Landis is a surname.

Landis may also refer to:

Places
Landis, North Carolina
Landis, Saskatchewan
Landis Mill Covered Bridge
George Landis Arboretum
Landis Valley Museum

Companies
Landis+Gyr, a Swiss corporation

See also
Landis' Missouri Battery